William and Mary Hosmer House is a historic home located at Auburn in Cayuga County, New York.  It is a two-story, three bay, side hall frame house in a vernacular Greek Revival style.  It is believed to have been built in the 1840s and enlarged sometime after the conclusion of the Civil War.  The house was owned by anti-slavery editor and author William Hosmer.

It was listed on the National Register of Historic Places in 2006.

References

External links

Houses on the National Register of Historic Places in New York (state)
Pre-emancipation African-American history
Houses in Cayuga County, New York
National Register of Historic Places in Cayuga County, New York
Buildings and structures in Auburn, New York